Stratford-on-Avon is a local government district in southern Warwickshire, England.

The district is named "Stratford-on-Avon" unlike its main town of Stratford-upon-Avon where the district council is based.

The district is mostly rural and covers most of the southern half of Warwickshire. As well as Stratford, other significant places in the district includes the towns of Alcester, Southam, Shipston-on-Stour and Henley-in-Arden, and the large villages of Bidford-on-Avon, Studley and Wellesbourne, plus numerous other smaller villages and hamlets.

It borders the Warwickshire districts of Warwick to the north, and Rugby to the north-east. It also borders the neighbouring counties of the West Midlands, Worcestershire, Gloucestershire, Oxfordshire, and Northamptonshire.

History
The district was formed on 1 April 1974 under the Local Government Act 1972 by the merger of the municipal borough of Stratford-upon-Avon, Alcester Rural District, Shipston-on-Stour Rural District, Southam Rural District and a majority of Stratford-upon-Avon Rural District.

Politics

Elections to the district council are held in three out of every four years, with one third of the 53 seats on the council being elected at each election. The Conservative party has controlled the council for most of the time since the first election in 1973, and recently has had a majority since the 2003 election. As a result of the last election in 2019 the Conservatives had 20 councillors, the Liberal Democrats had 11, independents had 4 and the Green Party has one. The council was due to merge in 2024 with neighbouring Warwick District Council. However in April 2022 the merger was scrapped, with Councillor Day (Warwick Leader) accusing Councillor Jefferson (Stratford Leader) of writing to Central Government behind his back, asking for more time for the merge to take place.

Parishes and settlements
Other than Stratford-upon-Avon the district includes:

Admington, Alcester, Alderminster, Ardens Grafton, Arlescote, Arrow, Aston Cantlow, Atherstone-on-Stour, Avon Dassett,
Barcheston, Barton-on-the-Heath, Bearley, Beaudesert, Bidford-on-Avon, Billesley, Binton, Bishops Itchington, Brailes, Broom, Burmington, Burton Dassett, Butlers Marston
Chadshunt, Chapel Ascote, Charlecote, Cherington, Chesterton and Kingston, Claverdon, Clifford Chambers and Milcote, Combrook, Compton Verney, Compton Wynyates, Coughton
Dorsington
Ettington, Exhall
Farnborough, Fenny Compton, Fulbrook
Gaydon, Great Alne, Great Wolford
Halford, Hampton Lucy, Harbury, Haselor, Henley-in-Arden, Hodnell and Wills Pastures, Honington
Idlicote, Ilmington
Kineton, Kinwarton
Ladbroke, Langley, Lighthorne, Lighthorne Heath, Little Compton, Little Wolford, Long Compton, Long Itchington, Long Marston, Lower Shuckburgh, Loxley, Luddington
Milcote, Moreton Morrell, Morton Bagot
Napton-on-the-Hill, Newbold Pacey, Northend
Oldberrow, Oversley Green, Oxhill
Pillerton Hersey, Pillerton Priors, Preston Bagot, Preston-on-Stour, Priors Hardwick, Priors Marston
Quinton
Radbourne, Radway, Ratley and Upton
Salford Priors, Sambourne,  Shipston-on-Stour, Shotteswell, Snitterfield, Southam, Spernall, Stockton, Stoneton, Stourton, Stratford-upon-Avon, Stretton-on-Fosse, Studley, Sutton-under-Brailes
Tanworth-in-Arden, Temple Grafton, Tidmington, Tredington, Tysoe
Ufton, Ullenhall, Upper Shuckburgh, Warmington, Watergall, Weethley, Welford-on-Avon, Wellesbourne, Weston-on-Avon, Whatcote, Whichford, Whitchurch, Willington, Wilmcote, Wixford, Wolverton, Wootton Wawen, Wormleighton

See also
List of wards in Stratford district by population

References

External links
 Stratford-on-Avon District Council YouTube channel

 
Non-metropolitan districts of Warwickshire